Dereboyu can refer to:

 Dereboyu Avenue, avenue in North Nicosia, Cyprus
 Dereboyu, Söğüt, Bilecik province, Turkey
 Dereboyu, Seben, Bolu province, Turkey
 Dereboyu, Ergani, Diyarbakır province, Turkey
 Dereboyu, Görele, Giresun province, Turkey
 Dereboyu, Pülümür, Tunceli province, Turkey